is a Japanese actor.

Career
Nakamura co-starred in Bok Geo-il's 2009 Lost Memories along with Jang Dong-gun and in Lou Ye's Purple Butterfly with Zhang Ziyi and Liu Ye.

He co-starred in Junji Sakamoto's 2010 film Strangers in the City with Manami Konishi.

Filmography

Film
 Be-Bop High School (1985)
 Shinshi Domei (1986)
 Bee Bop High School: Koko Yotaro Elegy (1986)
 Bee Bop High School: Koko Yotaro Kyoso-kyoku (1987)
 Bee Bop High School: Koko Yotaro March (1987)
 Bee Bop High School: Koko Yotaro Kanketsu-hen (1988)
 Getting Blue in Color (1988)
 Bee Bop High School: Koko Yotaro Ondo (1988)
 Memories of You (1988)
 Roppongi Banana Boys (1989)
 The Passage to Japan (1991)
 New York Cop (1993)
 Blue Tiger (1994)
 Last Friends (1995)
 Gen-X Cops (1999)
 Tokyo Raiders (2000)
 Unloved (2001)
 2009 Lost Memories (2002)
 Hana (2003)
 Purple Butterfly (2003)
 Sea Cat (2004)
 Blue Swallow (2005)
 Madamada Abunai Deka (2005) 
 Limit of Love: Umizaru (2006)
 Thank You (2006)
 Waruboro (2007)
 Aozora no Roulette (2007)
 Tokyo Tower: Mom and Me, and Sometimes Dad (2007)
 Love Never to End (2007)
 The Kiss (2007)
 Nagai Nagai Satsujin (2008)
 K-20: Legend of the Mask (2008)
 Shaolin Girl (2008)
 Mt. Tsurugidake (2009)
 I Give My First Love to You (2009)
 It's on Me (2009)
 The Summit: A Chronicle of Stones to Serenity  (2009)
 Oppai Volleyball (2009)
 Strangers in the City (2010)
 Saraba Itoshi no Daitoryo (2010)
 Kamifusen (2011)
 A Chorus of Angels (2012)
 Kerberos no Shouzou (2014)
 Memoirs of a Murderer (2017), Sendō
 Love Mooning (2021), Takashi Takizawa
 Kumo to Saru no Kazoku (2023)

Television
 Abunai Deka (1986)
 Kattenishiyagare Hey! Brother (1989)
 Nobunaga: King of Zipang (1992), Hashiba Hideyoshi
 Ryūkyū no Kaze (1993), Hashiba Hideyoshi
 Nemureru Mori (1998)
 Dear Tsugumi (2000)
 Ninjo Shigure Machi (2001)
 Kokoro Shoshu Hen (2003)
 Ashita Tenki ni Naare (2003)
 Destiny of Love (2004)
 Black Leather Notebook (2004)
 Umizaru (2005)
 Emergency Room 24 Hours 3 (2005)
 Animal Trail (2006)
 The Family (2007)
 Kaze no Hate (2007)
 4 Lies (2008)
 Team Batista no Eikō (2008)
 The Flying Tire (2009)
 General Rouge no Gaisen (2010)
 Ariadne no Dangan (2011)
 Suitei Yuzai (2012)
 Raden Meikyuu (2014)
 Kaiki Renai Sakusen (2015)
 Two Homelands (2019), Taketora Matsui
 Nemesis (2021)
 Japan Sinks: People of Hope (2021), Eiichi Higashiyama

References

External links
 
 

Japanese male film actors
Japanese male television actors
1966 births
Living people